William Collins (9 December 1837 – 12 January 1876) was an Australian cricketer. He was a right-handed batsman who played for Tasmania. He was born and died in Launceston.

Collins made a single first-class appearance for the side, during the 1872–73 season, against Victoria. From the lower-middle order, he scored 2 runs in the first innings in which he batted, and 14 runs in the second.

See also
 List of Tasmanian representative cricketers

External links
William Collins at Cricket Archive

1837 births
1876 deaths
Australian cricketers
Tasmania cricketers
Cricketers from Launceston, Tasmania